The 19th session of the National Assembly of South Korea first convened on 30 May 2012, and was seated until 29 May 2016. Its members were first elected in the 2012 legislative election held on 11 April 2012. It was preceded by the 18th National Assembly of South Korea and succeeded by the 20th National Assembly of South Korea.

Composition 
, there are four political parties represented in the National Assembly.

List of members

Constituency

Seoul

Busan

Daegu

Incheon

Gwangju

Daejeon

Ulsan

Sejong

Gyeonggi

Gangwon

North Chungcheong

South Chungcheong

North Jeolla

South Jeolla

North Gyeongsang

South Gyeongsang

Jeju

Proportional representation

Saenuri

Minjoo

Justice

Unified Progressive 

019
National Assembly members 019